Hugo Söderström (9 January 1902 – 27 November 1978) was a Swedish footballer and bandy player. As a footballer, he played as a centre-half. He made 22 Allsvenskan appearances for Djurgården and scored 2 goals.

As a bandy player, Söderström won two Swedish championship finals with IK Göta, 1928 and 1929. He made four appearances for Sweden 1928–32.

References

1902 births
1978 deaths
Association football central defenders
Swedish footballers
Allsvenskan players
Djurgårdens IF Fotboll players
Swedish bandy players
IK Göta Bandy players